Prince Georg of Denmark  (Georg Valdemar Carl Axel; 16 April 1920 – 29 September 1986) was a Danish diplomat and member of the Danish royal family as a great-grandson of Christian IX. He was a first cousin of Harald V of Norway, Baudouin of Belgium, Albert II of Belgium, and a second cousin of Prince Philip, Duke of Edinburgh.

Early life

Prince Georg was at Bernstorff Palace, the summer residence of his paternal grandfather, Prince Valdemar, on 16 April 1920. He was the eldest son of Prince Axel of Denmark and Princess Margaretha of Sweden. He received a military education at Jægersborg Barracks and served in World War II.

Marriage
On 16 September 1950, at Glamis Castle, he married Anne, Viscountess Anson, the daughter of the Hon. John Bowes-Lyon, brother of Queen Elizabeth of the United Kingdom, and ex-wife of Thomas, Viscount Anson. Anne was a first cousin of Elizabeth II of the United Kingdom, Prince Georg himself was a second cousin of George VI of the United Kingdom and Prince Philip, Duke of Edinburgh. 

At the time of his marriage, Danish princes normally lost their titles and places in the line of succession if they contracted a morganatic marriage. This was the case when Prince George's younger brother, Prince Flemming, married Ruth Nielsen in 1949, thus losing his princely title and being created Count of Rosenborg. Prince Georg attached greater significance to his title than his brother and implored Frederik IX, his second cousin, to allow him to retain his princely title and rank. George VI of the United Kingdom intervened on behalf of his wife's niece and allegedly told Frederik IX "If a Bowes-Lyon was good enough for me, a Bowes-Lyon is surely good enough for one of your Princes." The king relented and granted his permission for the marriage, thus Prince Georg retained his rank and his wife was recognized as a princess of Denmark.

As Viscountess Anson was divorced, the marriage was opposed by the Church of England and the Scottish Episcopal Church. Queen Elizabeth announced her intention to attend her niece's wedding, but Geoffrey Fisher, Archbishop of Canterbury, intervened, ordered the withdrawal of the Scottish Episcopal clergyman and “advised” the Queen not to attend.  The Queen and Princess Margaret attended only the wedding breakfast and waited in an adjoining drawing room while the ceremony took place. The service was conducted by the Rev. Mogens Buch, pastor of the Danish Seaman's Mission Church in Newcastle-upon-Tyne. The Rev. Canon H.G.G. Rorison, chaplain to the Earl of Strathmore, read the lesson as he was forbidden by the Anglican church hierarchy from conducting the service.

Later life

Prince Georg was in the line of succession to the Danish throne until the passing of the Act of Succession of 27 March 1953 which restricted succession rights to descendants of Christian X. At this time, his Danish title changed from Prins til Danmark (Prince to Denmark) to Prins af Danmark (Prince of Denmark).

He served as defense attaché to London and military, naval and air attaché at Paris. In 1975, he was named Honorary Colonel of the 5th Batallion of the Queen's Regiment in the British Army. He was an Honorary Knight Commander of the Royal Victorian Order and a Knight of the Order of the Elephant. 

Princess Anne died in 1980. In 1981, he attended the wedding of Charles, Prince of Wales, and Lady Diana Spencer. He died in Copenhagen on 29 September 1986 at the age of 66. He and wife are both buried in the grounds of Bernstorff Palace. His will was sealed in London after his death. His estate was valued at £785,000 (or £1.8m in 2022 when adjusted for inflation).

Ancestry

References

Citations

Bibliography

 

Danish princes
House of Glücksburg (Denmark)
1920 births
1986 deaths
Recipients of the Cross of Honour of the Order of the Dannebrog
Honorary Knights Commander of the Royal Victorian Order